John Tyndall (born 1951) is a Canadian poet living in London, Ontario.

Biography

John Tyndall works at University of Western Ontario as a Librarian at the D.B. Weldon Library.

His work has been published in several anthologies and has been collected in two full-length volumes. His work has been reviewed by the University of Toronto Quarterly and the Library Journal.

Tyndall published The Fee For Exaltation, in the Palm Poets series from the Canadian small press publisher Black Moss Press.

Books 
 Free Rein (Black Moss Press, 2001) 
 The Fee For Exaltation (Black Moss Press, 2007)

References 

1951 births
Living people
Canadian male poets
Writers from London, Ontario
20th-century Canadian male writers
20th-century Canadian poets